Bristol Pride is an annual festival in the city of Bristol, championing equality and diversity across South West England. Since 2010, the Bristol Pride festival has been organised by the charity 'Bristol Pride' (UK registered charity: 1166817). The festival is a fortnight of events in the city, and concludes with Pride Day on the second Saturday of July. Festival events include a mix of talks by prominent local activists and charities, screenings of LGBT films, performances, and various evenings of entertainment led by local drag artists. Pride Day includes the traditional Pride March, which begins in the city's Castle Park and ends at the Amphitheatre on the harbourside. Bristol Pride remains a free-to-attend festival, but encourages entry to the events by donation to enable the festival to continue.

The 2022 Pride Day took place on Saturday 9th July 2022.

History 
The first Pride in Bristol was held in 1977 as a fundraiser for the Gay News blasphemy trial.  The 1977 event evolved into Avon Pride and took place every year until around 1994.  In 1991 a special postmark was issued to mark the 15th Pride festival in Bristol.

A few small-scale festivals under the name Mardi Gras were held in the mid-2000s, with venues including the amphitheatre on Bristol harbourside and the Frogmore Street car park.

After a gap of some years, Pride was resurrected in 2010. Held at first in Bristol's Castle Park, in 2012 it was moved to College Green as a one-off due to the presence of an English Defence League march in the city centre. From 2016 the festival moved from Castle Park to the Bristol Harbourside, at Millennium Square and the Amphitheatre. In 2017, 36,000 people (including duplicated attendance) attended 19 events organised by Bristol Pride. To celebrate the tenth year of Bristol Pride in its current form and to accommodate ever-growing numbers of attendees, Bristol Pride moved the 2019 event from the Harbourside to the Downs, a large area of open public land in the north-west of the city.

Due to the COVID-19 pandemic, the 2020 event was suspended and it was later announced that it would be online-only; the 2021 march was likewise cancelled due to COVID-19 lockdowns, but returned in 2022 with Pride Day festivities again being held on the Downs.

Headliners 
Bristol Pride Day has included headline musical acts such as Kelis, Martha Wash, Blue, Sophie Ellis-Bextor and Lisa Stansfield. In 2018, singer Alexandra Burke, dance group Snap! and indie band Republica headlined the festival. The 2019 Pride Day included a diverse line up including Melanie C, Sink The Pink, RuPaul's Drag Race alumni Peppermint and the return of Sophie Ellis-Bextor. The 2022 Pride Day included Carly Rae Jepsen, Bright Light Bright Light, Toya Delazy and Canada's Drag Race winner Priyanka.

Gallery

References

External links

 

Pride parades in England
Organisations based in Bristol
LGBT organisations in England